Douglas “Dougie” James Henshall (born 19 November 1965) is a Scottish television, film and stage actor. He is best known for his roles as Professor Nick Cutter in the science fiction series Primeval (2007–2011) and Detective Inspector Jimmy Pérez in the crime drama Shetland (2013–2022).

Background
Henshall's mother was a nurse and his father a salesman. He attended Barrhead High School.  While studying there, he joined the Scottish Youth Theatre.  After graduation, he moved to London and trained at the Mountview Academy of Theatre Arts. Later, Henshall joined the 7:84 theatre company in Glasgow.  He later returned to London where he received critical acclaim for his theatre work, notably Life of Stuff at the Donmar Warehouse (1993) and American Buffalo at the Young Vic (1997). He married his partner, Croatian writer Tena Štivičić, in Las Vegas in February 2010.

Career

1990s
In 1993, Henshall appeared in Dennis Potter's television adaptation of Lipstick on Your Collar. He also portrayed T. E. Lawrence in a recurring role in the American television series Young Indiana Jones (1992–1996).  In 1993 he appeared in series 10 of The Bill. One of his first successful film roles was as Edgar in Angels and Insects (1995) before going on to star in Sharpe's Justice (1997), Orphans (1998), The Man with Rain in His Shoes (1998).  He has also starred in many television series and is known for his roles in Psychos (1999) This Year's Love (1999) and Kid in the Corner (1999) (for which he won a gold nymph as best actor in a mini-series at the Monte-Carlo TV festival in 2000).

2000s

Henshall appeared in the films Lawless Heart (2001) Gentlemen’s Relish (2001) and Silent Cry (2002). Roles on television include Konstantin Levin in Anna Karenina (2000), and Dan in Loving You (2003). He has also performed in plays for BBC radio, including the role of Romeo in Romeo and Juliet (1999) and David in The Long Farewell (2002).  In the summer of 2002, Douglas returned to the London stage where he performed the role of Michael Bakunin in Tom Stoppard's new trilogy of plays, The Coast of Utopia, at the National Theatre.

Henshall played Marcus in the post-production British comedy film French Film, alongside Hugh Bonneville and Anne-Marie Duff. He took the starring role as scientist Professor Nick Cutter in the first three series of the science fiction series Primeval from 2007 to 2009 and starred in Dorian Gray (2009) as the doctor Alan Campbell.

2010s

He went on to appear in another ITV1 show, Collision, in which he played the investigating officer of a multiple car crash.  In 2010, Douglas starred in a BBC1 drama called The Silence. He appeared in Series 5 of Lewis in the episode "The Mind Has Mountains" and as Cradoc in The Eagle (2011).

In summer 2011, Henshall starred in Harold Pinter's Betrayal at the Comedy Theatre in London's West End playing the lover of Emma, played by Kristin Scott Thomas. Her husband was played by Ben Miles and the revival was brought to life by director Ian Rickson. In autumn 2012, he appeared as Oliver Cromwell in the premiere of the new play 55 Days.

In 2012, he starred as Augustus Cribben in The Secret of Crickley Hall, and in the ITV television film of Ian Rankin's novel Doors Open.

In 2013, Henshall starred as Detective Inspector Jimmy Pérez in the BBC drama Shetland filmed in Lerwick and Glasgow. The story was based on Ann Cleeves' Shetland crime novel Red Bones. A second series of six episodes consisted of three, two-part, stories based on Cleeve's  Raven Black, Dead Water and Blue Lightning. It screened in the UK in March and April 2014. A further series was filmed in 2015, screening on BBC1 in the UK during January and February 2016.  Henshall won the Bafta Scotland best television actor award in 2016 for his work in the series and the show won the best television drama.

In 2015, Henshall starred as Taran MacQuarrie in the TV series Outlander.

In 2016, he starred in the Scottish three-part television drama series In Plain Sight as the detective William Muncie, who pursued serial murderer Peter Manuel to his conviction and ultimate execution by hanging.

Henshall starred in the film Iona, written and directed by Scott Graham, which opened in March 2016. It is the story of a mother who burns her car and takes her teenage son on a ferry to the island she was named after. In 2019 he appeared as antiquarian book dealer Adam Snow in Susan Hill's Ghost Story - The Small Hand (Channel 5 TV).

Filmography

References

External links

Betrayal, "Comedy Theatre Review",  The Telegraph, 17 June 2011
Betrayal – Review, "Comedy Theatre London",  The Guardian, 17 June 2011
First Night: Betrayal, "Comedy Theatre London",  ''The Independent', 17 June 2011

Male actors from Glasgow
Alumni of the Mountview Academy of Theatre Arts
Scottish male film actors
Scottish male stage actors
1965 births
Living people
People from Barrhead
People associated with Shetland